Bizzarone is a  (municipality) in the Province of Como in the Italian region Lombardy, located about  northwest of Milan and about  west of Como, on the border with Switzerland.

Bizzarone borders the following municipalities: Mendrisio (Switzerland), Novazzano (Switzerland), Rodero, Stabio (Switzerland), Uggiate-Trevano, Valmorea.

References

External links
 Official website

Cities and towns in Lombardy